The Engelstad Foundation, a nonprofit 501(c)(3) organization, was established in June 2002 to continue the philanthropic efforts of Ralph Engelstad. It was originally developed with the purpose of promoting medical research, improving the lives of people living with disabilities and creating new possibilities for high-risk individuals. The Engelstad Foundation focuses its efforts on education, healthcare, disabled individuals and childhood issues, among other areas. The foundation controls about $800 million in assets and has given over $300 million in grants, scholarships and donations to a number of nonprofits and partners throughout the United States.

History 
In 1979, Ralph Engelstad opened the Imperial Palace hotel-casino in Las Vegas, Nevada. He received attention for hiring disabled individuals, which was rare at the time. The Engelstad family continued quietly donating to charities and institutions in communities they had connections to. Before he died in November 2002, Ralph Engelstad put a plan into motion to create a foundation that would allow the assets he acquired to be given back after his death. In 2002, Ralph and Betty Engelstad officially formed the Engelstad Foundation with the goal of continuing Ralph's charitable work.

Since its establishment, the Engelstad Foundation has provided more than $300 million in grants to organizations spanning the states of North Dakota, Nevada, Minnesota, Utah and Mississippi. The Engelstad family has history in the markets that the foundation serves. For example, the foundation holds strong ties to Thief River Falls, Minnesota, where Ralph Engelstad was born. There is a strong presence in North Dakota as well – where Ralph Engelstad graduated from the University of North Dakota and met his wife, Betty, during his time in Grand Forks. The foundation’s ties to Mississippi derive from the 1997 opening of the second Imperial Palace in Biloxi, Mississippi. The foundation is currently based in Las Vegas, Nevada, where Ralph Engelstad built his business as an entrepreneur and where the Engelstad family has lived for many years.

Leadership 
The Engelstad Foundation is currently run by trustees Betty Engelstad, Kris Engelstad McGarry and Jeffrey M. Cooper.

Betty Engelstad, widow of Ralph Engelstad, worked in a bank as a young girl which primed her for the budgeting that she would be doing for both her own family and eventually the Engelstad Foundation. Betty prefers to remain out of the public eye when it comes to the foundation’s giving, but her role in staging the creation of the foundation remains evident. Ralph and Betty Engelstad’s daughter, Kris Engelstad McGarry, also serves as a trustee for the foundation. In many instances, she is the face of the foundation in the public eye. Jeffrey M. Cooper worked with Ralph Engelstad as his certified public accountant. He also served as treasurer for the Imperial Palace Casino Resort Spa in Biloxi, Mississippi that was owned and operated by Engelstad. Since 2002, his role has also included acting as a trustee on the Engelstad Foundation board.

Philanthropy 
As a foundation that has been granted charitable status, the Engelstad Foundation is required to file IRS 990-PF form annually. In reporting year ending December 2017, the foundation reported assets of $797,016,392 and income of $45,726,634. The Engelstad Foundation promotes the welfare of others through generous donations to what they believe to be good causes. Donations to organizations focus on various categories including animal compassion, at-risk individuals, education, historical preservation, medical research and support, people with disabilities and veterans.

The extent of the organization’s philanthropic endeavors has led multiple associations to honor the foundation.

References 

2002 establishments in Nevada
Organizations established in 2002
Charities based in Nevada